The 6th of October Governorate was one of the governorates of Egypt. It was located in Middle Egypt, to the west of the Nile valley. It was dissolved on 14 April 2011 and was reincorporated into the Giza Governorate.

History
The 6th of October Governorate was split from the Giza Governorate on 17 April 2008. It was created through a presidential decree in order to ease the burden placed on Giza, one of Egypt's most densely populated governorates. The 6th of October City became the capital of the 6th of October Governorate, which was mostly made up of recently established planned communities such as the Sheikh Zayed City. On 14 April 2011, prime minister Essam Sharaf dissolved the 6th of October Governorate and reincorporated its territory into the Giza Governorate.

The governorate's name commemorates the Egyptian military's successful crossing of the Suez Canal on 6 October 1973 during the October War. 6 October is also Egypt's Armed Forces Day.

Geography
The area of the 6th of October primarily consists of desert, but contains the left bank of the Nile valley to both the north and south of Giza, and the important oasis town of Bahariya. It is traversed by the northeasterly line of equal latitude and longitude, a line where the northern latitude and eastern longitude are the same.

Cities
 6th of October City

See also
 Giza Governorate
 Helwan governorate (now defunct)

References

 
Former governorates of Egypt
States and territories established in 2008
States and territories disestablished in 2011
2008 establishments in Egypt
2011 disestablishments in Egypt